is a Japanese manga artist. Fumizuki's most famous work to date is Ai Yori Aoshi, a 17-volume work which has been turned into an anime series.  This series was followed by Umi no Misaki, serialized in Young Animal Magazine starting in the fifth issue of 2007 and concluding with its 127th and final chapter in the fifth issue of 2014. Both of these seinen manga series are harem-type romance comedies in which a naive young man finds himself surrounded by pretty girls vying for his attention. Since 2011 he has also been serializing Itadaki!, a light comedy about a girls' mountain climbing club, which appears intermittently in the magazine Young Animal Island.  Starting October 9, 2015 in Young Animal he launched a new series, Boku to Rune to Aoarashi, about an art school student who goes on a pilgrimage to meet a great landscape painter named Seiran, and discovers an extraordinary girl in Seiran's household.  In October 2016 it was announced that the final chapter of Boku to Rune to Aoarashi would appear in the 21st issue of 2016, out October 28.

Works

References

External links
 
 Kou Fumizuki at Media Arts Database 

Living people
Manga artists from Fukuoka Prefecture
Year of birth missing (living people)